Oiteyama Hirokuni, born Mitsugu Yamaguchi (16 June 1938 – 2 January 2014), was a sumo wrestler from Goshogawara, Aomori, Japan. He made his professional debut in May 1953 and reached the top division in May 1960. His highest rank was maegashira 6. Upon retirement from active competition he became an elder in the Japan Sumo Association. He reached the Sumo Association's mandatory retirement age of 65 in June 2003.

Career record
The Kyushu tournament was first held in 1957, and the Nagoya tournament in 1958.

See also
Glossary of sumo terms
List of past sumo wrestlers
List of sumo tournament second division champions

References

1938 births
2014 deaths
People from Goshogawara
Japanese sumo wrestlers
Sumo people from Aomori Prefecture